Indian Institute of Management Sirmaur (IIM Sirmaur or IIM S) is an autonomous public business school located in Sirmaur, Himachal Pradesh. The institute, set up in 2015 by the Government of India, is one of the twenty Indian Institutes of Management (IIMs). It has been recognized as an Institute of National Importance by the Government of India in 2017.

The institute conducts a full range of academic activities in the field of management education covering research, teaching, training, consulting and intellectual infrastructure development. The institute emphasises the development of analytical skills and a focus on global and cross-cultural issues with a balance between business demands and social concerns.

History 
IIM Sirmaur was founded in 2015. The institution started the first batch of its Post Graduate Programme (PGP) in management from 4 September 2015. The institute has started groundwork for its activities under the guidance and mentorship of the Indian Institute of Management Lucknow.

Campus 

The temporary campus of IIM Sirmaur is at Himachal Institute of Technology, Paonta Sahib, Sirmaur. Paonta Sahib is an industrial town in the south of Sirmaur district and is well connected to Dehradun, Chandigarh, Shimla, Delhi, etc. National Highway 7 passes through the town. Two hundred acres of land has been acquired in Dhaula Kuan for the permanent campus of the institute.

Construction of the permanent campus started on 4 August 2020. The institute will be collaborating with the Central Public Works Department and the first of three phases of construction is expected to be completed by June 2022.

Library 
IIM Sirmaur has an in-house library equipped with both print and electronic resources. The library has around 650 books and a subscription of 22 periodicals and 5 newspapers in hard copies. In addition, it provides access to over 30,000 e-books titles, 4000 e-newspapers and 500 e-Magazines. The library is accessible 24 × 7 and several online databases such as ACE-KP, ACE-MF, ACE-Equity, ABI, Ebrary and PressReader.

Organisation and administration 
In February 2017, Dr. Neelu Rohmetra of University of Jammu was appointed as the founding director of Indian Institute of Management Sirmaur.

Academics 
IIM Sirmaur previously offered Post Graduate Programme, which is equivalent to MBA. Since the IIM Act, they have been offering the Master of Business Administration degree. This is a two-year, regular, full-time residential programme. Admission to the MBA course of IIM Sirmaur is conducted each year through Common Admission Test (CAT).

Rankings 

IIM Sirmaur was ranked 69th among business/management schools in India by  National Institutional Ranking Framework (NIRF) in 2022.

References

External links
 

SIRMAUR
Business schools in Himachal Pradesh
Education in Sirmaur district
Educational institutions established in 2015
2015 establishments in Himachal Pradesh